Bingley Peak is located on the border of Alberta and British Columbia. It was named in 1863 by Walter Cheadle.

See also
List of peaks on the Alberta–British Columbia border
Mountains of Alberta
Mountains of British Columbia

References

Bingley Peak
Bingley Peak
Canadian Rockies